Michel Thierry (born 29 August 1954) is a French cross-country skier. He competed at the 1976 Winter Olympics and the 1980 Winter Olympics.

References

1954 births
Living people
French male cross-country skiers
Olympic cross-country skiers of France
Cross-country skiers at the 1976 Winter Olympics
Cross-country skiers at the 1980 Winter Olympics
Place of birth missing (living people)